Gosch is a surname. Notable people with the surname include:

 Brian Gosch (born 1971), American politician
 Florian Gosch (born 1980), beach volleyball player
 Ingrid Gosch (born 1949), Austrian fencer
 Johnny Gosch (born 1969), missing person
 Paul Gosch (1885–1940), German artist